Ferdinando Camon (born in Montagnana  1935) is a contemporary Italian writer.  He is married to a journalist and has two sons: Alessandro Camon, a film producer/writer who lives in Los Angeles, and Alberto, who teaches criminal procedure and lives in Bologna.  He has contributed to a number of Italian and foreign daily newspapers, including La Stampa, l'Unità, Avvenire, Le Monde and La Nación.

Perhaps Camon's best known work in English is his trilogy of fictional memoirs consisting of The Fifth Estate (Il Quinto Stato), Life Everlasting (La Vita Eterna), and Memorial (Un altare per la madre).

Works

Il Quinto Stato, Garzanti, 1970
La Vita Eterna, Garzanti, 1972
Liberare l'animale, Garzanti, 1973
Occidente, Garzanti, 1975
Storia di Sirio, Garzanti, 1984
Un altare per la madre, Garzanti, 1978
La malattia chiamata uomo, Garzanti, 1981
La donna dei fili, Garzanti, 1986
Il canto delle balene, Garzanti, 1989
Il Super-Baby, Rizzoli, 1991
Mai visti sole e luna, Garzanti, 1994
La Terra è di tutti, Garzanti, 1996
Dal silenzio delle campagne, Garzanti, 1998
Conversazione con Primo Levi
La cavallina, la ragazza e il diavolo, Garzanti, 2004

Awards

Premio Luigi Russo (Il Quinto Stato)
Premio Città di Prato (La vita eterna)
Premio Viareggio di poesia (Liberare l'animale)
Premio Strega (Un altare per la madre)
Premio Giornalista del mese (al tempo di Occidente)
Premio Selezione Campiello (La donna dei fili)
Premio Selezione Campiello (Il canto delle balene)
Premio Elsa Morante (Il Super-Baby)
Premio Stazzema Alla Resistenza (Mai visti sole e luna)
Premio Pen Club (Mai visti sole e luna)
Premio Città di Bologna (Dal silenzio delle campagne)
Premio Giovanni Verga (La cavallina, la ragazza e il diavolo)

References

20th-century Italian novelists
20th-century Italian male writers
21st-century Italian novelists
1935 births
Strega Prize winners
Living people
21st-century Italian male writers